Kyliegh Curran (born , 2005) is an American actress. She starred in the horror film Doctor Sleep and plays Harper on the Disney Channel mystery series Secrets of Sulphur Springs. She previously played young Nala in a Broadway production of The Lion King.

Early life and education
Curran was born in Miami, Florida on December 10, 2005. Her maternal grandfather is the Bahamian-American writer and scholar Whittington B. Johnson.

She started taking acting classes at seven years old. She moved to New York City for her career. Through first and second grades, Curran practiced theater at an Actors' Playhouse conservatory close to the Broadway theatre area. Curran, not finding film-related opportunities in Miami and New York, started attending the British Academy of Performing Arts in Marietta, Georgia and the Renaissance International School of Performing Arts in Milton, Georgia. As part of growing up with an acting career, she is homeschooled.

Career
Curran's first show was Madeline's Christmas in Coral Gables, Florida. When she was 10 years old, she was cast as Young Nala in Julie Taymor's Broadway production of The Lion King. In 2015, she was cast in her first film role in the independent film I Can I Will I Did, which was released in 2017. While living in Georgia, she auditioned for the Stephen King-based horror film Doctor Sleep and was cast in a leading role opposite Ewan McGregor playing Abra, a girl with psychic powers. Following Doctor Sleep, she began work on the Disney Channel series Secrets of Sulphur Springs playing Harper.

Personal life
Living in Atlanta, Curran works with the organizations Girls, Inc. and Reach Out and Read Georgia. She is also involved with environmental issues.

Credits

References

External links

Living people
2005 births
21st-century African-American women
21st-century African-American people
21st-century American actresses
Actresses from Miami
African-American actresses
African-American child actresses
American child actresses
American people of Bahamian descent